Leonard Patrick Kelly (born June 23, 1962 in Toronto, Ontario) is a former ice speed skater from Canada, who represented his native country in two consecutive Winter Olympics, starting in 1992 in Albertville, France. He now lives and skates part-time in Lake Placid, NY. On Feb 6th, 2010 he skated a 40.13 outdoors on the Olympic oval.

References

External links
 
 Speed Skating Results
 Canadian Olympic Committee

1962 births
Living people
Canadian male speed skaters
Speed skaters at the 1992 Winter Olympics
Speed skaters at the 1994 Winter Olympics
Olympic speed skaters of Canada
Sportspeople from Toronto
20th-century Canadian people